This list is of the Places of Scenic Beauty of Japan located within the Prefecture of Shimane.

National Places of Scenic Beauty
As of 1 January 2021, seventeen Places have been designated at a national level.

Prefectural Places of Scenic Beauty
As of 14 September 2020, six Places have been designated at a prefectural level.

Municipal Places of Scenic Beauty
As of 1 May 2020, eleven Places have been designated at a municipal level.

Registered Places of Scenic Beauty
As of 1 January 2021, six Monuments have been registered (as opposed to designated) as Places of Scenic Beauty at the national level.

See also
 Cultural Properties of Japan
 List of Historic Sites of Japan (Shimane)
 List of parks and gardens of Shimane Prefecture

References

External links
  Cultural Properties in Shimane Prefecture

Tourist attractions in Shimane Prefecture
Places of Scenic Beauty